This is the complete list of Commonwealth Games medallists in rugby sevens from 1998 to 2014.

Medallists

Men

Women

References

Results Database from the Commonwealth Games Federation

Rugby
Medalists

Commonw